J. Wayne Streilein (Johnstown, Pennsylvania, June 19, 1935 – March 15, 2004) was a scientist whose main area of research was the ocular immune system. He is known particularly for studying the mechanisms that keep the cornea avascular despite the inflammatory and other stimuli that usually promote small blood vessel ingrowth; these peculiar corneal mechanisms provide the basis for what is known as the "corneal antiangiogenic privilege".

Books
 Immunology: A Programmed Text by Wayne J. Streilein (Hardcover – May 1977)
 
 Immune Privilege, Sites, Tissues, Strategies and Diseases (Medical Intelligence Unit Series) by J. Wayne Streilein (Hardcover – Jan 1997)

References

External links
 Ocular Immune Privilege by J. Wayne Streilein; a free-access article at Karger Gazette.

American ophthalmologists
American immunologists
1935 births
2004 deaths